Year in topic Year 1013 (MXIII) was a common year starting on Thursday (link will display the full calendar) of the Julian calendar.

Events 
 By place 
 Europe 
 King Henry II of Germany signs a peace treaty at Merseburg with Duke Bolesław I the Brave) of Poland. As part of the treaty, Bolesław pays homage and recognizes Henry as his overlord in exchange for receiving the March of Lusatia (including the town of Bautzen) and the March of Meissen as fiefs. To seal their peace, Bolesław's son Mieszko II marries Richeza of Lotharingia (granddaughter of the late Emperor Otto II).
 Sulayman ibn al-Hakam reconquers the Caliphate of Córdoba in Al-Andalus (modern Spain) and deposes Hisham II. Sulayman becomes the fifth Umayyad caliph of Córdoba (until 1016).
 Winter – Henry II (anxious to be crowned as Holy Roman Emperor) mobilises a German expeditionary army at Augsburg, to begin his second Italian military campaign.

 England 
 Summer – Danish Viking raiders led by Sweyn Forkbeard (accompanied by his son Cnut) sail from Denmark to attack England. Again London defends itself and the Vikings move elsewhere, plundering Wessex, Mercia and Northumbria. King Æthelred the Unready sends his sons Edward and Alfred to Normandy. Æthelred retreats to the Isle of Wight and follows them later into exile.
 December 25 – Sweyn Forkbeard takes control of the Danelaw and is proclaimed king of England in London. Some of the English provinces refuse to pay homage to Sweyn, who has no dynastic right to claim the throne.

 Asia 
 September – Emperor Sanjō of Japan visits the home of influential statesman Fujiwara no Michinaga.
 December – Fujiwara no Masanobu, an officer of the guard of empress consort Kenshi of Japan, is killed by Fujiwara no Korekane and Michinaga orders the assassin imprisoned.
 The Four Great Books of Song, the Song dynasty Chinese encyclopedia Prime Tortoise of the Record Bureau which has been compiled since 1005, is completed in 1,000 volumes of 9.4 million written Chinese characters.
 Kaifeng, capital of China, becomes the largest city of the world, taking the lead from Córdoba in Al-Andalus (modern Spain).

 By topic 
 Religion 
 Æthelred II appoints Lyfing as archbishop of Canterbury in England. He restores Canterbury Cathedral, adding porticus towers and a massive westwork.
 Beauvais changes from a county to a bishopric (approximate date).

Births 
 July 18 – Hermann of Reichenau, German music theorist (d. 1054)
 August 15 – Teishi (Yōmeimon-in), Japanese empress consort (d. 1094)
 September 22 – Richeza (or Adelaide), queen of Hungary (d. 1075)
 Abu al-Walid al-Baji, Moorish scholar and poet (d. 1081)
 Guaimar IV of Salerno, Italian nobleman (approximate date)
 Isaac Alfasi, Algerian Talmudist and posek (d. 1103)

Deaths 
 April 19 – Hisham II, caliph of Córdoba (Spain) (b. 966)
 June 5 – Al-Baqillani, Arab theologian, jurist and logician
 c. August? – Mufarrij ibn Daghfal ibn al-Jarrah, Jarrahid emir (b. c.977)
 Al-Mahdi al-Husayn, Zaidi imam of Yemen (b. 987)
 Abu al-Qasim al-Zahrawi, Arab physician, "father of surgery", author of Al-Tasrif (b. 936)
 Giselbert I, count of Roussillon (Spain) (or 1014)
 Reginar IV, French nobleman (approximate date)

References

Sources